The 1982 Montreal Concordes finished the season in 4th place in the East Division with a 2–14 record and missed the playoffs. After the Montreal Alouettes folded after the 1981 season, Expos owner Charles Bronfman became the owner of the new football team the Montreal Concordes, who retained the Alouettes players.

Preseason

Regular season

Standings

Schedule

References

External links
Official Site

Montreal Alouettes seasons
1982 Canadian Football League season by team
1980s in Montreal
1982 in Quebec